Heol y Cyw Rugby Football Club are a rugby union club based in the Heol-y-Cyw, Wales. Heol y Cyw RFC are members of the Welsh Rugby Union and is a feeder club for the Cardiff Blues.

Heol-y-Cyw RFC were formed in 1906. The present club house was built in 1976, and was officially opened by Wales rugby great Barry John.

Club badge
The club badge is a shield which houses the image of a stone bridge and three chickens or cockerels. The shield is topped by a red dragon and a scroll with the team name lies beneath the shield. The badge reflects the town name, which roughly translates to the 'Road of the chicken', and also lends to the team nickname, 'The Cockerels'.

Notable former players
  Allan Bateman

References

Welsh rugby union teams